Esclanèdes is a commune in the Lozère department in southern France.

Its inhabitants are known as Esclanédiens.

Geography
The main part of the commune is located in the Lot valley, whereas the rest is on the Causse of Sauveterre. The town hall is located in the biggest burg called Le Bruel, on the north side of the river. Esclanèdes is named after the burg situated on the north side and where is located the church. Other inhabited places are the small burgs of Les Crottes et la Rocherousse and the two farms of Marance and Le Mazet.

The adjoining communes are the following:
Chanac on the southwest side
Grèzes on the north side
Cultures on the east side
Gabrias on the northeast side
Barjac on the northeast and southeast sides

Administration
The current mayor is Pascale Bonicel, elected in 2020.

Demographics

Between 1990 and 1999:
Population in 1990: 217
Population in 1999: 250
Natural increase: - 2
Net migration: + 35
Population growth: + 33
Average variation rate of the population by year: +1,5%

See also
Communes of the Lozère department

References

Sights

Communes of Lozère